Alexander Pusch (born 15 May 1955 in Tauberbischofsheim, Baden-Württemberg) is a German fencer and Olympic champion in épée competition.

Biography
Alexander Pusch fought for the Fencing-Club Tauberbischofsheim. He won a gold medal in the individual épée event and a team silver medal at the 1976 Summer Olympics in Montreal. He won a gold medal in the team épée in 1984, and a silver medal in 1988. In July 2016, he was inducted into Germany's Sports Hall of Fame.

References

1955 births
Living people
People from Tauberbischofsheim
Sportspeople from Stuttgart (region)
German male fencers
Olympic fencers of West Germany
Fencers at the 1976 Summer Olympics
Fencers at the 1984 Summer Olympics
Fencers at the 1988 Summer Olympics
Olympic gold medalists for West Germany
Olympic silver medalists for West Germany
Olympic medalists in fencing
Medalists at the 1976 Summer Olympics
Medalists at the 1984 Summer Olympics
Medalists at the 1988 Summer Olympics